Kurt Rub (born 28 February 1946) is a Swiss former racing cyclist. He was the Swiss National Road Race champion in 1970. He also rode in the 1971 Tour de France.

References

External links
 

1946 births
Living people
People from Zurzach District
Swiss male cyclists
Sportspeople from Aargau